The Patriarch of Antioch is a traditional title held by the bishop of Antioch (modern-day Antakya, Turkey). As the traditional "overseer" (from which the word bishop is derived) of the first gentile Christian community, the position has been of prime importance in Pauline Christianity from its earliest period. This diocese is one of the few for which the names of its bishops from the apostolic beginnings have been preserved. Today five churches use the title of patriarch of Antioch: one Oriental Orthodox (the Syriac Orthodox Church); three Eastern Catholic (the Maronite, Syriac Catholic, and Melkite Greek Catholic Churches); and one Eastern Orthodox (the Greek Orthodox Church of Antioch).

According to the pre-congregation church tradition, this ancient patriarchate was founded by the Apostle Saint Peter. The patriarchal succession was disputed at the time of the Meletian schism in 362 and again after the Council of Chalcedon in 451, when there were rival Melkite and non-Chalcedonian claimants to the see. After a 7th-century succession dispute in the Melkite church, the Maronites began appointing a Maronite patriarch as well. After the First Crusade, the Catholic Church began appointing a Latin Church patriarch of Antioch, though this became strictly titular after the Fall of Antioch in 1268, and was abolished completely in 1964. In the 18th century, succession disputes in the Greek Orthodox and Syriac Orthodox Churches of Antioch led to factions of those churches entering into communion with Rome under claimants to the patriarchate: respectively the Melkite Greek Catholic patriarch of Antioch and the Syriac Catholic patriarch of Antioch. Their respective Orthodox counterparts are the Greek Orthodox patriarch of Antioch and the Syriac Orthodox patriarch of Antioch.

History

First Christians

In Roman times, Antioch was the principal city of the Roman Province of Syria, and the fourth largest city of the Roman Empire, after Rome, Ephesus and Alexandria.

The church in Antioch was the first to be called "Christian," according to Acts. According to tradition, Saint Peter established the church and was the city's first bishop, before going to Rome to found the Church there. Ignatius of Antioch (died c. 107), counted as the third bishop of the city, was a prominent apostolic father. By the fourth century, the bishop of Antioch had become the most senior bishop in a region covering modern-day eastern Turkey, Lebanon, Israel, Palestine, Syria, Jordan, Iraq, and Iran. His hierarchy served the largest number of Christians in the known world at that time. The synods of Antioch met at a basilica named for Julian the Martyr, whose relics it contained.

Despite being overshadowed in ecclesiastical authority by the patriarch of Constantinople in the later years of the Eastern Roman Empire, the Antiochene Patriarch remained the most independent, powerful, and trusted of the eastern patriarchs. The Antiochene church was a centre of Christian learning, second only to Alexandria. In contrast to the Hellenistic-influenced Christology of Alexandria, Rome, and Constantinople, Antiochene theology was greatly influenced by Rabbinic Judaism and other modes of Semitic thought—emphasizing the single, transcendent divine substance, which in turn led to adoptionism in certain extremes, and to the clear distinction of two natures of Christ (: dyophysitism): one human, the other divine. Lastly, compared to the Patriarchates in Constantinople, Rome, and Alexandria which for various reasons became mired in the theology of imperial state religion, many of its Patriarchs managed to straddle the divide between the controversies of Christology and imperial unity through its piety and straightforward grasp of early Christian thought which was rooted in its primitive Church beginnings.

Chalcedonian split
The Christological controversies that followed the Council of Chalcedon in 451 resulted in a long struggle for the Patriarchate between those who accepted and those who rejected the Council. The issue came to a head in 512, when a synod was convened in Sidon by the non-Chalcedonians, which resulted in Flavian II (a Chalcedonian) being replaced as Patriarch by Severus (a non-Chalcedonian). The non-Chalcedonians under Severus eventually came to be called the Syriac Orthodox Church (which is a part of the Oriental Orthodox Church), which has continued to appoint its own Syriac patriarchs of Antioch. The Chalcedonians refused to recognise the dismissal and continued to recognise Flavian as Patriarch forming a rival church. From 518, on the death of Flavian and the appointment of his successor, the Chalcedonian Church became known as the Byzantines' (Rūm) Church of Antioch. In the Middle Ages, as the Byzantine Church of Antioch became more and more dependent on Constantinople, it began to use the Byzantine rite.

The internal schisms such as that over Monophysitism were followed by the Islamic conquests which began in the late 7th century, resulting in the patriarch's ecclesiastical authority becoming entangled in the politics of imperial authority and later Islamic hegemony. Being considered independent of both Byzantine and Arab Muslim power but in essence occupied by both, the de facto power of the Antiochene patriarchs faded. Additionally, the city suffered several natural disasters including major earthquakes throughout the 4th and 6th centuries and anti-Christian conquests beginning with the Zoroastrian Persians in the 6th century, then the Muslim Arabs in the seventh century before the city could be recovered by the Byzantine Empire in 969.

Great schism
Over the centuries, differences between the Church in the East and West emerged such as the use of unleavened bread for the Eucharist in the West or the addition of the filioque to the Nicene Creed by Pope Sergius IV. The resulting schism, the Great Schism, has often been dated to the 1054 mission of Cardinal Humbert to Constantinople when Humbert excommunicated (invalidly) the Patriach of Constantinople, Michael I Cerularius, who in turn excommunicated the Pope and removed him from the diptychs. Consequently, two major Christian bodies broke communion became two fractions: One faction, now identified as the Catholic Church, represented the Latin West under the leadership of the pope; the other faction, now identified as the Eastern Orthodox Church, represented the Greek East under the collegial authority of the patriarchs of Antioch, Jerusalem, Constantinople and Alexandria.  This split, however, was then most likely known only within higher clerics who either gave it little importance or expected it to be overcome soon.

As with the patriarchates of Alexandria and Jerusalem, communication between Rome and Antioch was not as easy as between Rome and Constantinople. Nevertheless, documentation between Antioch and Rome exist such as when in 1052 Patriarch Peter III send news of his appointment to Leo IX and asked him to send a profession of faith back as the popes had not been commemorated in the diptychs for 30 years. After Michael I Cerularius had excommunicated the Latin Church in 1054, informed also Peter III whose reply shows the non-importance he and many others maintained toward the events of 1054; Peter maintained the Latins were their brothers but that their thinking was prone to error and that as barbarians they should be excused from a precise understanding of orthodoxy. In 1085, the city was captured by Sultanate of Rum but it was allowed that John the Oxite, the newly appointed patriarch by emperor Alexios I Komnenos could live in the city. When the army of the First Crusade appeared before the walls of Antioch, John was imprisoned by the city's governor and subject to torture in front of the eyes of the crusaders. After the conquest of the city in June 1098, John was released and reinstated by the spiritual leader of the crusader, Adhemar of Le Puy, as patriarch of Antioch. After Adhemar's death, the Norman Bohemond of Taranto established himself as prince of Antioch and went in opposition to Alexios I in 1099/1100, forcing John to leave the patriarchate due to his suspected loyalty to the Byzantine Emperor. Bohemond selected a Frankish cleric loyal to him as new patriarch, thus starting the Latin Patriarchate of Antioch.

The Western influence in the area was finally ended by the victories of the Muslim Mamluks over the Crusader States in the 13th century. In 1268 the Principality of Antioch came to an end with the brutal conquest of the city by Mamluks which left the significance of the patriarchate, together with the ecclesiastical schisms between Rome and Constantinople and between Constantinople and Alexandria and Antioch, isolated, fractured and debased. The Latin Patriarch went into exile in 1268, and the office became titular only. The office fell vacant in 1953 and was finally abolished in 1964.

Melkite split of 1724
In 1724, Cyril VI was elected Greek patriarch of Antioch. He was considered to be pro-Rome by the patriarch of Constantinople, who refused to recognize the election and appointed another patriarch in his stead. Many Melkites continued to acknowledge Cyril's claim to the patriarchate. Thus from 1724 the Greek Church of Antioch split up in the Greek Orthodox Church of Antioch and in the Melkite Greek Catholic Church. In 1729, Pope Benedict XIII recognized Cyril as the Eastern Catholic patriarch of Antioch and welcomed him and his followers into full communion with the Catholic Church.

Current patriarchs 
Today, five churches claim the title of patriarch of Antioch; three of these are autonomous Eastern Catholic particular churches in full communion with the pope of Rome. All five see themselves as part of the Antiochene heritage and claim a right to the Antiochene See through apostolic succession, although none are currently based in the city of Antakya. This multiplicity of Patriarchs of Antioch as well as their lack of location in Antioch, reflects the troubled history of Christianity in the region, which has been marked by internecine struggles and persecution, particularly since the Islamic conquest.  Indeed, the Christian population in the original territories of the Antiochene patriarchs has been all but eliminated by assimilation and expulsion, with the region's current Christians forming a small minority.

The current patriarchs of Antioch are listed below in order of their accession to the post, from earliest to most recent.
 Ignatius Aphrem II, Patriarch of Antioch and All the East. He is the Supreme Head of the Syriac Orthodox Church, which is part of the Oriental Orthodox communion and uses the Antiochene liturgy. His see is based in Damascus.
Ignatius Joseph III Yonan, patriarch of Antioch and all the East of the Syrians. Ignace Joseph III is the leader of the Syrian Catholic Church, an Eastern Catholic Church that is in full communion with the Roman Catholic Church's Holy See at the Vatican and uses the Antiochene liturgy.  The see is based in Beirut.
 Bechara Boutros Rahi, Maronite patriarch of Antioch and the whole Levant. The Maronite Church is an Eastern Catholic Church that is in full communion with the Roman Catholic Church and uses the Maronite liturgy. His see is based in Bkerké, Lebanon.
 John X of Antioch was elected Greek Orthodox patriarch of Antioch and All the East on December 17, 2012. John X is the leader of the Antiochian Orthodox Church, and thus is one of the major hierarchs in the Eastern Orthodox Church. His see is based in Damascus and uses the Byzantine liturgy.

 Joseph Absi, Patriarch of Antioch and All the East, Alexandria, and Jerusalem of the Greek Melkites. He is the leader of the Melkite Greek Catholic Church, an Eastern Catholic Church that is in full communion with the Roman Catholic Church and uses the Byzantine liturgy. His see is based in Damascus.

At one point, there was at least nominally a sixth claimant to the Patriarchate. When the Western European Crusaders established the Principality of Antioch, they established a Latin Church church in the city, whose head took the title of Patriarch.  After the Crusaders were expelled by the Mamluks in 1268, the pope continued to appoint a titular Latin patriarch of Antioch, whose actual seat was the Basilica di Santa Maria Maggiore in Rome. The last holder of this office was Roberto Vicentini, who died without a successor in 1953. The post itself was abolished in 1964.

Episcopal succession

One way to understand the historical interrelationships between the various churches to examine their chain of episcopal succession—that is, the sequence of bishops that each church regards as having been the predecessors of each church's current claimant to the patriarchate. There were four points in history where a disputed succession to the patriarchate led to a lasting institutional schism, leading to the five churches that exist today.

All five churches recognize a single sequence of bishops until 518. In that year, Severus, who rejected the Council of Chalcedon, was deposed by the Byzantine Emperor Justin I and replaced by the Chalcedonian Paul the Jew, but Severus and his followers did not recognize his deposition. This led to two rival sequences of patriarchs: Severus and his successors, recognized by the two Syriac churches; and Paul and his successors, recognized by the Greek Orthodox, Melkite, and Maronite Churches. It was the successors of Paul who were recognized as legitimate by the Byzantine government.
In 685, John Maron, who recognized the legitimacy of Paul the Jew and his successors until Byzantium began to appoint titular patriarchs of Antioch ending with Theophanes (681–687), was elected Patriarch of Antioch by the Maradite army. Byzantine Emperor Justinian II sent an army to dislodge John from the see; John and his followers retreated to Lebanon, where they formed the Maronite Church, whose succession of patriarchs have continued to the present day. The Byzantines appointed Theophanes of Antioch in his stead. Thus there were now three rival patriarchs: those that recognized Severus and his successors, those that recognized John Maron and his successors, and those that recognized Theophanes and his successors. It was the successors of Theophanes who were recognized as legitimate by the Byzantine government.
In 1724, the church that recognized Theophanes and his successors elected Cyril VI Tanas, who supported re-establishing communion with the Catholic Church that had been broken in the Great Schism, as patriarch of Antioch. However, the ecumenical patriarch declared Cyril's election invalid, and appointed Sylvester of Antioch in his stead. Cyril and Sylvester both had followers, and both continued to claim the patriarchate. The Melkite Greek Catholic Church recognizes Cyril and his successors; the Greek Orthodox Church of Antioch recognizes Sylvester and his successors.
In 1783, a faction within the church that recognized Severus and his successors elected Ignatius Michael III Jarweh, a bishop who was already in communion with the Catholic Church, as patriarch of Antioch. Shortly thereafter, another faction, who rejected communion with Rome, elected Ignatius Matthew. Both had followers, and both continued to claim the patriarchate. The Syriac Orthodox Church recognizes Ignatius Mathew and his successors; the Syriac Catholic Church recognizes Ignatius Michael and his successors.

Thus, the succession recognized by each church is as follows:

The Syriac Orthodox Church recognizes the succession from the Apostle Peter to Severus, then recognizes Sergius of Tella as Severus's successor in 544, then recognizes Sergius's successors down to Ignatius George IV, then recognizes Ignatius Matthew as Ignatius George's successor in 1783, then recognizes Ignatius Matthew's successors down to Ignatius Aphrem II today.
The Greek Orthodox Church of Antioch recognizes the succession from the Apostle Peter to Severus, then recognizes that Severus was deposed in favor of Paul the Jew in 518, then recognizes Paul the Jew's successors down to Athanasius III Dabbas, then recognizes Sylvester of Antioch as Athanasius III's successor in 1724, then recognizes Sylvester's successors down to John X today.
The Maronite Church recognizes the succession from the Apostle Peter to Severus, then recognizes that Severus was deposed in favor of Paul the Jew in 518, then recognizes Paul the Jew's successors until Byzantium began appointing titular Patriarchs of Antioch ending with Theophanes (681–687), at which point they recognize the election of John Maron, then recognize John's successors down to Bechara Boutros al-Rahi today.
The Melkite Greek Catholic Church recognizes the succession from the Apostle Peter to Severus, then recognizes that Severus was deposed in favor of Paul the Jew in 518, then recognizes Paul the Jew's successors down to Peter III, then recognizes Cyril VI Tanas as Peter III's successor in 1724, then recognizes Cyril VI's successors down to Youssef Absi  today.
The Syriac Catholic Church recognizes the succession from the Apostle Peter to Severus, then recognizes Ignatius Michael III Jarweh as Severus's successor in 1783, then recognizes Ignatius Michael III's successors down to Ignatius Joseph III Yonan today.

Lists of patriarchs of Antioch 
 List of patriarchs of Antioch before 518, 37–546
 List of Syriac Orthodox patriarchs of Antioch, 512–present
 List of Syriac Catholic patriarchs of Antioch, 1662–present
 List of Greek Orthodox patriarchs of Antioch, 518–present
 List of Melkite Catholic patriarchs of Antioch, 1724–present
 List of Maronite patriarchs of Antioch, 686–present
 List of Latin patriarchs of Antioch, 1098–1964

See also 
 Melkite Greek Catholic Church
 Greek Orthodox Church of Antioch
 Syriac Orthodox Church
 Syriac Catholic Church
Syriac Orthodox Patriarch of Antioch and All the East

References

Sources

External links 
 Catholic Encyclopedia: Antioch, Church of. Full history
 Melkite Greek Catholic Patriarchate of Antioch, Alexandria and Jerusalem

Apostolic sees
 
Dioceses established in the 1st century
34
Antioch